Justin Catayée (30 May 1916 – 22 June 1962) was a French politician who served in the French National Assembly from 1958–1962 and was the  founder of the Guianese Socialist Party and hero of World War II. He was born in Cayenne, French Guiana, and died in the crash of Air France Flight 117 into a mountain in Guadeloupe on 22 June 1962.

References

External links
 page on the French National Assembly website

1916 births
1962 deaths
People from Cayenne
French people of French Guianan descent
French Guianan politicians
French Section of the Workers' International politicians
Guianese Socialist Party politicians
Deputies of the 1st National Assembly of the French Fifth Republic
French military personnel of World War II
Recipients of the Croix de Guerre 1939–1945 (France)
Victims of aviation accidents or incidents in 1962
Victims of aviation accidents or incidents in North America
Accidental deaths in Guadeloupe